Scorilo (died  70) was a Dacian king who may have been the father of Decebalus. Evidence for his life and reign is fragmentary.

Sources
The Roman historian Jordanes lists a series of Dacian kings before Decebalus, placing a ruler called "Coryllus" between Comosicus and the independently attested Duras, who preceded Decebalus as king. Coryllus is supposed to have presided over a long peaceful 40-year rule.

The name Coryllus is not mentioned by any other historian, and it has been argued that it "is a misspelling of Scorilo, a relatively common Dacian name". On this basis, Coryllus has been equated with the Scorilo named on an ancient Dacian pot bearing the words “Decebalus per Scorilo”. Though far from certain, this has also been translated as "Decebalus son of Scorilo". If so, this might mean that Decebalus was the son of Scorilo, with Duras possibly being either an older son or a brother of Scorilo. A Dacian king (dux Dacorum) called Scorilo is also mentioned by Frontinus, who says he was in power during a period of turmoil in Rome.

From this evidence and references to Dacian kings elsewhere, it is suggested that Scorilo probably ruled from the 30s or 40s AD through to 69-70.

Reign

The Dacians regularly raided into Roman territory in Moesia. The emperors Tiberius and Caligula solved this problem by paying protection money to the Dacians in the form of annual subsidies. This policy appears to have coincided with the reign of Scorilo. Scorilo's brother was apparently held captive for a period in Rome, but was released in exchange for a promise that the Dacians would not intervene in Rome's volatile power-politics.

During the reign of Nero, troops were withdrawn from the Dacian border, leaving the empire vulnerable. When Nero was overthrown in 69, the empire was plunged into turmoil in the Year of Four Emperors. The Dacians appear to have tried to take advantage of the situation to launch an invasion of Moesia in alliance with the Sarmatian Roxolani. The invasion was ill-timed. Licinius Mucianus, a supporter of Vespasian, was advancing with an army through Moesia towards Rome to overthrow Vitellius. The Dacians unexpectedly encountered his forces and were pushed back, suffering a major defeat.

Scorilo appears to have died around this time, perhaps during the campaign.

References

Dacian kings
1st-century monarchs in Europe
Dacian names